Pat Fielder (born Patricia Penny) was an American screenwriter known for penning cult B monster movies like The Return of Dracula in the 1950s. For TV, she worked on everything from Baretta to The Rifleman to Starsky & Hutch.

Biography 
Pat was born in Pasadena, California, to Patrick Penny and Mary Lloyd. She attended John Marshall High and later UCLA, where she studied theatre arts; after graduation, she worked as a teacher before landing a job at Gramercy Pictures. After initially serving as a production assistant, she was eventually given the chance to write scripts, starting with The Vampire and The Monster that Challenged the World.

Selected filmography 

 Goliath Awaits (1981) (TV movie)
 Baretta (1977–1978) (TV series)
 Geronimo (1962)
 The Rifleman (1959–1962) (TV series)
 The Return of Dracula (1958)
 The Flame Barrier (1958) 
 The Monster That Challenged the World (1957)
 The Vampire (1957)

References 

American screenwriters
American women screenwriters
Screenwriters from California
University of California, Los Angeles alumni
1929 births
2018 deaths
21st-century American women